Nicola Mary Shadbolt  is a New Zealand farmer, academic and company director. She is currently a full professor at the Massey University and Chair of Plant & Food Research.

Academic career
Shadbolt earned degrees from the University of Nottingham and Lincoln College (at that time a constituent college of the University of Canterbury) and a diploma from Massey University. Her master's thesis was titled Alternative management strategies and drafting policies for irrigated Canterbury sheep farms. Shadbolt worked at the Ministry of Agriculture and Fisheries and then in a variety of roles in government, agribusiness and consultancy before moving to Massey University, rising to full professor.

From 1994 to 2001, Shadbolt was on the board of Transit New Zealand. She held multiple roles, including director, within the Fonterra group of companies from 2009 to 2018.

In 2017, Shadbolt won the rural section of the Westpac New Zealand Women of Influence Award, and in the 2018 Queen's Birthday Honours, she was appointed an Officer of the New Zealand Order of Merit for services to agribusiness.

On 19 August 2019 Shadbolt was appointed as Chair and Director of the Plant & Food Crown Research Institute. On 17 December 2019 Shadbolt was appointed as a member of the Climate Change Commission.

Selected works

References

External links
  
 

Living people
Year of birth missing (living people)
New Zealand women academics
Alumni of the University of Nottingham
Lincoln University (New Zealand) alumni
New Zealand women in business
New Zealand businesspeople
Officers of the New Zealand Order of Merit
Academic staff of the Massey University
New Zealand Women of Influence Award recipients